Edmund H. Hansen (November 13, 1894 – October 10, 1962) was an American sound engineer. He won two Academy Awards; one for Best Sound Recording and the other Best Visual Effects. He was nominated for another 12 films across the two categories.

Filmography

Best Sound Recording
Won
 Wilson (1944)

Nominated
 The White Parade (1934)
 Thanks a Million (1935)
 Banjo on My Knee (1936)
 In Old Chicago (1937)
 Suez (1938)
 The Rains Came (1940)
 The Grapes of Wrath (1940)
 How Green Was My Valley (1941)
 This Above All (1942)
 The Song of Bernadette (1943)

Best Visual Effects
Won
 The Rains Came (1940)

Nominated
 The Blue Bird (1940)
 A Yank in the R.A.F. (1941)

References

External links

1894 births
1962 deaths
American audio engineers
Special effects people
People from Springfield, Illinois
Best Sound Mixing Academy Award winners
Best Visual Effects Academy Award winners
Engineers from Illinois
20th-century American engineers